Borlänge  is a locality in Dalarna County, Sweden with 44,898 inhabitants as of 2020. It is the seat of the Borlänge Municipality with a total population of 51,604 inhabitants as of 2017.

History 

Originally Borlänge was the name of a tiny village, and the first historical information about it is from 1390.  The village was insignificant up until about 1870. In 1872 the construction of Domnarfvets Jernverk, the ironworks of neighbouring village Domnarvet started. In 1875 a railway between Falun and Ludvika, via Borlänge was inaugurated. Thanks to its railway station the village of Borlänge became highly important in servicing the ironworks.

In 1898, Borlänge was granted privileges by the national Swedish government as a market town (Swedish: köping) with about 1,300 inhabitants, but still today it belongs to the Church of Sweden's regionally historically dominant parish of Stora Tuna, centered on a large medieval church by that name (meaning great enclosed farmyards), now located in a rural district east of the city. In 1898, the Stora Kopparbergs Bergslag - the owner of the ironworks in Domnarvet at the time - built a papermill in an adjacent village to Borlänge called Kvarnsveden, upstream from Domnarvet. Many area residents emigrated to the United States in the late 19th and early 20th centuries.

In 1944, the City of Borlänge was incorporated after the market town joined the industrial towns of Domnarvet and Kvarnsveden. In 1971 the municipality of Borlänge was established when the Stora Tuna municipality merged with the City of Borlänge.

From the 1940s onward, politics in the municipality has been dominated by the Social Democratic Party.

In the early 1970s, the Kvarnsvedens Pappersbruk paper mill and the Domnarvets Jernverk steel mill had a high demand for employees.

Between 1970-1974, the Tjärna Ängar Million Programme district was built.

In the 1990s, Borlänge had the highest crime rate per thousand inhabitants in Sweden, dominated by violence and theft.

During all of the 20th century Borlänge has been a typical heavy industry community with relatively good economic growth; today the service industry is also thriving and in considerable expansion.

Demographics 

According to the Borlänge Municipality, as of 2017, Borlänge has a population of 51,604 inhabitants. 11,693 residents in the city are of foreign origin, comprising 22.7% of the total population. Of these individuals, 8,837 were born abroad and 2,856 were born in Sweden. Most of the residents of foreign background come from Asia, Africa, other Nordic countries, and other parts of Europe.

According to the Borlänge Municipality, in the 1990s, most foreign-born residents of Borlänge arrived from Southern Europe, due to the civil wars in Yugoslavia. During the 2000s, immigrants in the city primarily came from Somalia, Iraq and Turkey. The Somalia-born immigrants mainly arrived via family reunification. This migration had decreased by the following decade, with most newcomers in Borlänge now consisting of asylum immigrants from Syria and Eritrea. As of 2016, there are 472 refugees in the municipality, most of whom originate from Syria (218), Eritrea (121), and Somalia (56). The newer asylum immigrants in the city largely emigrated from Syria and Eritrea.

As of 2017, the most common countries of origin for total foreign-born individuals residing in Borlänge are 
 Somalia (3,114) 
 Finland (1,570) 
 Syria (1,032) 
 Iraq (1,028)
 Turkey (926)
 Eritrea (350)
 Thailand (322) 
 Iran (240)
 Ex-Yugoslavia (197) 
 Norway (174).

Districts 
Borlänge's official districts and their inhabitants from 1975-2010:

Tjärna ängar 

According to the Borlänge Municipality, many of the city's inhabitants with a foreign background live in the neighborhoods of Jakobsgårdarna and Tjärna Ängar (nicknamed "Lilla Mogadishu" because of its many Somalia-born inhabitants).

An agreement between the Borlänge Municipality and the Swedish Migration Board to receive 30 refugees per year has contributed to the population growth, with many arriving via family reunification. Additionally, people have relocated to the city from other areas. Many are young, with few individuals older than 60 years of age. Over a five-year period, the number of inhabitants in Tjärna Ängar increased considerably, as 1,000 young persons relocated to the neighborhood. The new arrivals principally came from two or three foreign backgrounds, and included university students and people who had emigrated from abroad.

In its December 2015 report, the Swedish Police Authority placed the Borlänge's Tjärna Ängar district in the second highest category of urban areas with high crime rates. In the summer of 2016, there was widespread vandalism, cars were torched and when firefighters arrived, they were attacked with stones and had to wait for police to escort them in order to complete their mission. The Dalarna University College has student accommodation in the area where female students are sexually harassed by the local male youth on a regular basis and avoid going outdoors after sunset.

In a 2018 interview, the local police commissioner stated in an interview that clan leaders and religious leaders have taken over the leadership of the area, where 9 out of 10 are born abroad. Police has noted a change in 2017 when crime happens, nobody calls the police but the injured parties settle among themselves according to "an eye for an eye" in a parallel justice system.

Economy

Employers 
Borlänge has always been an industrial town surrounding the iron mill of Domnarvet (SSAB) and the paper mill of Kvarnsveden (Stora Enso). As a city with a structure heavily divided by rails and roads, with a modern city center, Borlänge also houses the head office for a state authority - the National Swedish Transport Administration Trafikverket.

Sport 
The city boasts a football team that has been successful in the past, although it is currently going through some hard times. IK Brage, named after the Norse god, has a history of 18 seasons in the Swedish Premier Division (Allsvenskan). Brage plays in green and white and hosts its home games at Domnarvsvallen Stadium in Borlänge, with a seating capacity of 6,500. Another Borlänge team which has had a great deal of success in the sport, with both domestic and foreign fans following their progress, is the multicultural soccer team Dalkurd FF.

Other sports clubs located in Borlänge include:

Forssa BK
IF Tunabro
Islingby IK
Kvarnsvedens IK
Stora Tuna OK

In 2013, a Somali national bandy team was formed in Borlänge with the goal of participating in the 2014 Bandy World Championship.

The 2008 Women's Bandy World Championship was also arranged with Borlänge as the main venue.

In 1999 the large orienteering competition O-Ringen was held around Borlänge, gathering 15 238 participants.

The 1993 World Gliding Championships were held at the Borlänge Airport, east of the town.

Music
As is the case with its twin city, Falun, music is an important part of Borlänge. It has been the hometown of many new young musicians in Sweden such as Mando Diao, Sugarplum Fairy and Miss Li and offers the possibility to get a degree in popular music at BoomTown Music Education, a branch of the School of Music at Luleå University of Technology.

The stoner rock band STONEWALL NOISE ORCHESTRA (stylized S*N*O) was formed 2004 in Borlänge.

The annual but now defunct Peace & Love music festival was hosted in Borlänge.

The power metal band Twilight Force has several members from Borlänge and Falun.

Notable people
Simon Aspelin, tennis player
Tess Asplund, activist - Borlänge is the site of her protest against neo-Nazis
Astral Doors, heavy metal band
Jens Bergenström hockey player
Jussi Björling, tenor
Dozer, stoner rock band
Mattias Ekholm, - NHL Hockey Player for Edmonton Oilers
Erik Eriksson, Centre Party's first chairman
Tomas Forslund, ice hockey player
Per Fosshaug, bandy player
Lars Frölander, swimmer
Greenleaf, stoner rock band
Nils Patrik Johansson, heavy metal singer
Lars Jonsson, ice hockey player
Gabriel Karlsson hockey player
Mando Diao, rock band
Miss Li, musician
Lasse Nilsson, football player
Gustaf Norén, musician
Mattias Ritola hockey player
Rootvälta, reggae band
Sator, rock band (earlier Sator Codex)
Sugarplum Fairy, rock band
Johan Olof Wallin, archbishop, poet and psalmist

Education 
 Dalarna University College
 Soltorgsgymnasiet
Hagagymnasiet
Rytmus
Erikslundgymnasiet

References 

 
Municipal seats of Dalarna County
Swedish municipal seats
Populated places in Borlänge Municipality
Market towns in Sweden
Cities in Dalarna County

fi:Borlängen kunta